Ian Alexander (born April 20, 2001) is an American actor, known for their roles as Buck Vu on The OA, Lev in The Last of Us Part II, and Gray Tal on Star Trek: Discovery.

Early and personal life 
Alexander was born in Salt Lake City, Utah, to an American father and a Vietnamese mother. Due to their father's work with the Department of Defense, their family often moved and has lived in places such as Hawaii, Japan and Washington, D.C. During elementary school, they participated in community theater and chorus. Though they were raised in a Mormon family, they are not a participating member, and consider themself to be agnostic. They came out as a transgender in 2014 and through the course of their transition identified as trans masculine while using he/him pronouns exclusively. As of late 2020 Alexander adopted the use of they/them, shortly thereafter identifying as non-binary and preferring the use of they/them while accepting the alternative use of he/him. They are pansexual.

They received viral attention online through their photo response to a transphobic incident perpetrated by four UCLA college students.

Career 
Alexander's debut acting role was on Netflix's The OA, where they played Buck Vu. Buck, like Alexander, is also a Vietnamese-American transgender youth and was partially based on Alexander's real experiences. They were cast from an open casting call online that spread through Tumblr. Later they were cast in the 2018 feature film Every Day, based on the book by David Levithan, playing Vic, a trans teen whom the spirit "A" inhabits for a day. In October 2017, Naughty Dog announced Alexander had joined the cast for The Last of Us Part II, the sequel to their popular video game. They played Lev, a transgender character in the game.

In June 2019, to mark the 50th anniversary of the Stonewall Riots, sparking the start of the modern LGBTQ rights movement, Queerty named them one of their Pride50: "trailblazing individuals who actively ensure society remains moving towards equality, acceptance and dignity for all queer people". Similarly, Alexander was one of the cover stars for the 2019 Pride issue of them., "spotlighting three rising queer artists whose work and lives are breaking new ground for LGBTQ+ visibility". In March 2020, it was announced Alexander will star in the independent film Daughter.

In September 2020, it was announced Alexander had joined the cast of Star Trek: Discovery; they play the first transgender character played by a transgender actor in the Star Trek canon. Alexander voices Tai, one of Lunella's classmates, in Moon Girl and Devil Dinosaur. Tai is revealed to be non-binary in the episode "Check Yourself", as Lunella refers to Tai using they/them pronouns.

Filmography

Notes

References

External links 
 
 
 
 
  – uploaded by the director and co-writer Corey Clark

21st-century American actors
American non-binary actors
American transgender actors
American film actors of Vietnamese descent
American television actors
Actors from Salt Lake City
Transgender rights activists
Transgender non-binary people
Pansexual entertainers
Pansexual actors
2001 births
Living people
LGBT people from Utah
American LGBT people of Asian descent
Pansexual non-binary people